Grave Desires is a 1991 album by the band Lestat. This release was available only on cassette and is currently out of physical print. It wasn't until 2010 that the full album would be available through digital distribution. Grave Desires was originally released by Jevan Records. This release marked the arrival of Timothy to the band.

Track listing

Credits
Razz (Evan Nave) - Vocals, Drum Programming and Keys
Susan - Guitar and Backing Vocals
Jess - Keys and Backing Vocals
Timothy - Drums and Drum Programming

References

Dark wave albums
1991 albums